Splendrillia alticostata is a species of sea snail, a marine gastropod mollusk in the family Drilliidae.

Description
The length of the shell varies between 10 mm and 12 mm.

Distribution
This species occurs in the Caribbean Sea off Guadeloupe and the Netherlands Antilles.

References

 Fallon P.J. (2016). Taxonomic review of tropical western Atlantic shallow water Drilliidae (Mollusca: Gastropoda: Conoidea) including descriptions of 100 new species. Zootaxa. 4090(1): 1–363

External links
 

alticostata
Gastropods described in 2016